Luis Enrique Oseguera (born 6 May 1976) is a former professional footballer who played in the CONCACAF Champions' Cup and FIFA World Youth Championship.

Career
Born in Olanchito, Oseguera began playing football as a striker with youth sides El Sauce and Instituto San Isidro. He joined C.D. Victoria in 1992, and helped the club to a runners'-up finish in the 1992 cup. Oseguera won the 1994–95 league title with Victoria before being sold to Salvadorean side C.D. Luis Ángel Firpo in 1995.

Firpo were losing league finalists in his first two seasons (his two goals helped the club win a semi-final against his future club C.D. Águila in 1997), before winning the league in the 1997–98 season. Oseguera also played for Firpo in the 1997 CONCACAF Champions' Cup, losing in the quarter-finals to the LA Galaxy.

Oseguera had brief spells with C.D. Marathón and Guatemalan sides Tally Juca and C.D. Suchitepéquez before finishing his career in Honduras. He played for C.D. Broncos, Victoria, F.C. Motagua, Platense F.C., C.D.S. Vida, Hispano F.C. and Villanueva F.C. before retiring at age 31. He led the league in goal-scoring while with Broncos and helped Motagua to a runners'-up league finish in 2002–03.

Oseguera represented Honduras at youth level, playing in the 1995 FIFA World Youth Championship finals in Qatar. He also played in the 1995 Pan American Games.

References

External links
Profile at BDFA

1976 births
Living people
Honduran footballers
C.D. Broncos players
C.D. Victoria players
C.D. Marathón players
F.C. Motagua players
Platense F.C. players
C.D.S. Vida players
Hispano players
C.D. Luis Ángel Firpo footballers
C.D. Águila footballers
C.D. Suchitepéquez players
Association football forwards